Antony "Tony" Smith (born 16 July 1970), also known by the nickname "Casper", is an English former professional rugby league footballer who played in the 1980s, 1990s and 2000s, and coached in the 2000s.

Playing career
While at Wigan Smith won caps for England while at Castleford in the 1995 Rugby League World Cup against France (sub), Fiji, South Africa (sub), Wales, and Australia. Smith was selected to play for England in the 1995 World Cup Final at  but Australia won the match and retained the Cup.

He again played for England in the 2000 Rugby League World Cup against Australia, Fiji, Ireland (sub), and New Zealand, and won caps for Great Britain while at Castleford in 1996 against Papua New Guinea (sub), and Fiji (sub), and while at Wigan in 1998 against New Zealand (3 matches).

Tony Smith was an interchange/substitute, i.e. number 14, (replacing  Grant Anderson at half-time (40-minutes)) in Castleford's 12–28 defeat by Wigan in the 1992 Challenge Cup Final during the 1991–92 season at Wembley Stadium, London on Saturday 2 May 1992, in front of a crowd of 77,386.

Tony Smith played, and scored a try in Castleford's 28–6 victory over Bradford Northern in the 1991 Yorkshire County Cup Final during the 1991–92 season at Elland Road, Leeds on Sunday 20 October 1991.

Coaching career
Tony Smith is a former coach of Super League club Wakefield Trinity Wildcats. He was appointed in August 2005 after a successful spell as caretaker coach following the sacking of Australian Shane McNally. However, with the Wakefield Trinity Wildcats facing relegation, he was sacked in July 2006 and replaced a few days later by John Kear. He was subsequently Assistant Coach at Featherstone Rovers under head coach David Hobbs.

References

External links
Castleford Tigers profile

1970 births
Living people
Place of birth missing (living people)
Castleford Tigers players
England national rugby league team players
English rugby league coaches
English rugby league players
Great Britain national rugby league team players
Hull F.C. players
Rugby league five-eighths
Rugby league halfbacks
Rugby league hookers
Rugby league players from Castleford
Wakefield Trinity coaches
Wigan Warriors players
Yorkshire rugby league team players